Jorge Luis Guzmán Rodríguez (born 13 December 2003) is a Mexican professional footballer who plays as a forward for Liga MX club Atlas.

Career statistics

Club

References

External links
 
 
 

Living people
2003 births
Association football forwards
Atlas F.C. footballers
Liga MX players
Footballers from Jalisco
People from Puerto Vallarta
Mexican footballers